
Gmina Padew Narodowa is a rural gmina (administrative district) in Mielec County, Subcarpathian Voivodeship, in south-eastern Poland.

Villages
Gmina Padew Narodowa contains the villages and settlements of Babule, Domacyny, Kębłów, Padew Narodowa, Piechoty, Pierzchne, Przykop, Rożniaty, Wojków, Zachwiejów, Zaduszniki and Zarównie.

Neighbouring gminas
Gmina Padew Narodowa is bordered by the gminas of Baranów Sandomierski, Gawłuszowice, Osiek and Tuszów Narodowy.

References
Polish official population figures 2006

Padew Narodowa
Mielec County